Gurrajupeta is a village in Visakhapatnam district of the Indian state of Andhra Pradesh. It is located in Rayavaram mandal.

References 

Villages in Anakapalli district